Pittston is a city in Luzerne County, Pennsylvania, United States. It is situated between Scranton and Wilkes-Barre in Northeastern Pennsylvania. The city gained prominence in the late 19th and early 20th centuries as an active anthracite coal mining city, drawing a large portion of its labor force from European immigrants. The population was 7,739 as of the 2010 census, making it the fourth largest city in Luzerne County.

At its peak in 1920, the population of Pittston was 18,497. The city consists of three sections: The Downtown (in the center of the city), the Oregon Section (in the southern end), and the Junction (in the northern end). Pittston City is at the heart of the Greater Pittston region (a 65.35 square mile region in Luzerne County). Greater Pittston has a total population of 48,020 (as of 2010).

History

Establishment

Pittston lies in the Wyoming Valley on the east side of the Susquehanna River and on the south side of the Lackawanna River. It is approximately midway between Wilkes-Barre and Scranton. Named after the famous British statesman William Pitt the Elder, the city was settled around 1770 by the Susquehanna Company of Connecticut. It was originally called "Pittstown."

During the Revolutionary War, the Wyoming Valley became a battleground between the British and the Americans. On July 3, 1778, a force of British provincial soldiers, with the assistance of about 500 Iroquois, attacked and killed about 300 Patriot soldiers at the Battle of Wyoming.

A company of militia, led by Captain Jeremiah Blanchard and Lieutenant Timothy Keyes, held and maintained a fort in Pittston. The fort was surrendered on July 4, 1778, one day after the Battle of Wyoming, and was later partially burned. In 1780, Pittston Fort was reoccupied, restored and strengthened. From then on it was under Patriot control until the end of the war in 1783, with the signing of the Treaty of Paris. Today a marker stands at the site where the fort once stood.

Pittston broke away from Pittston Township and officially became a borough in 1853. John Hosie served as the first burgess of the Borough of Pittston. It was later chartered as a city on December 10, 1894. Thomas J. Maloney served as the city's first mayor from 1894 to 1898. Throughout the late 1890s, Pittston's borders extended from Scranton to Wilkes-Barre, but due to financial and civil differences, the community would soon be divided into the many townships and boroughs that exist throughout the central Wyoming Valley today.

Coal mining

Pittston is located within Pennsylvania's Coal Region. The first discovery of the anthracite coal (in the Wyoming Valley) occurred around 1770. The first mine was established in 1775 near Pittston. With the opening of a canal in the 1830s, Pittston became an important link in the coal industry. Money made through the mining and transportation of coal led some of the leading merchants to petition its separation from Pittston Township. The anthracite and railroad industry attracted thousands of immigrants, making Pittston a true melting pot with once-distinct ethnic and class neighborhoods. The population of Pittston boomed in the late 19th century. The boom continued well into the 20th century.

The anthracite coal mining industry, and its extensive use of child labor in the early part of the 20th century, was one of the industries targeted by the National Child Labor Committee and its hired photographer, Lewis Hine. Many of Hine's subjects were photographed in the mines and coal fields in and around Pittston between 1908 and 1912. The impact of the Hine photographs led to the enactment of child labor laws across the country.

Mining disasters

Coal mining remained the prominent industry in Pittston for many decades, but disasters did strike on more than one occasion. The first major tragedy occurred in the Newton Coal Company's Twin Shaft Mine (near the city's railroad junction). In the early morning hours of June 28, 1896, ninety miners were at work in the Red Ash Vein of the Newton Coal Company's Twin Shaft Mine in Pittston. At 3:00 am, the roof quickly caved-in. The concussion from the explosion was so great that it was heard for miles around. The foundation of nearly every building in Pittston was shaken. The cave-in killed 58 miners (including the city's then-acting mayor, Michael J. Langan).

Anthracite coal mining remained a major industry in the Greater Pittston region until the Knox Mine Disaster. It essentially killed the industry in Northeastern Pennsylvania. On January 22, 1959, the ice-laden Susquehanna River broke through the roof of the River Slope Mine of the Knox Coal Company in nearby Port Griffith (in Jenkins Township). This allowed for billions of gallons of river water to flood the interconnected mines. It took three days to plug the hole in the riverbed, which was done by dumping large railroad cars, smaller mine cars, culm, and other debris into the whirlpool formed by the water draining into the mine.

Sixty-nine miners escaped; twelve miners died and their bodies were never recovered. The heroic efforts of one miner, Myron Thomas of Taylor, led twenty-six miners to safety. Another group of six men was led by Pacifico "Joe" Stella of Pittston. Amedeo Pancotti was part of the second group, and for his remarkable climb out of the Eagle Air Shaft (the only exit available) to the surface, he was awarded the Carnegie Medal for Heroism from the Carnegie Hero Fund Commission.

At 5:15 pm on November 27, 1942, the cave-in of an anthracite mine, that had not been operated since 1868, caused the earth of a half square mile of Pittston to crack and subside.

The largest crack was "...five feet wide, 150 feet long and so deep the bottom was not visible. Two hundred homes were twisted, cracked or sprung from their foundations. Sidewalks were torn up and gas and water mains snapped in several places.  Water cascaded through the streets and flooded cellars."

"Since 1942 the Pennsylvania DEP [Department of Environmental Protection] and its predecessor, Pennsylvania Department of Environmental Resources (PADER), as well as the U.S. Department of the Interior/Office of Surface Mining, Reclamation and Enforcement (OSM), have investigated 149 mine-related subsidence events in the city."

Boom and bust

Pittston became an active railroad center in response to its mining and industrial activity. The Lehigh Valley Railroad maintained a station in downtown Pittston, near the foot of the Water Street Bridge. The station did not survive the urban renewal of the 1960s and was demolished in 1964. Pittston also had a station on the historic Lackawanna and Wyoming Valley Railroad, commonly known as the Laurel Line.

Besides mining anthracite coal, Pittston was home to many industries in the 19th and 20th centuries, including metals, plastics, paper products, apparel, electrical equipment and beverages. The Pittston Stove Company, established in 1864, manufactured coal and wood-burning stoves for heating and cooking. The Pittston Brewing Company, brewers of Glennon's Beer, maintained operations in Pittston from 1873 until 1948. Evan R. Jones Stoneware crafted pottery which bore the Pittston name in the 1870s and 1880s.

From the 1930s to the 1980s, Pittston City emerged as a national center for clothing manufacturing. Thousands of workers, mainly women, labored in many factories throughout the Greater Pittston area. Most were members of the International Ladies' Garment Workers' Union (ILGWU). They fought for higher wages, workplace health & safety improvements, and employee rights. The ILGWU was active in civic and political life throughout Pennsylvania.

Main Street was the site of an active downtown into the 1970s, with many clothing stores, shoe stores, jewelers, JC Penneys, Kresge's, Woolworth's, drug stores, restaurants, theaters and banks. It was home to at least two theaters, the Roman at 27 South Main and the American at 48 North Main, both of which have been razed. Many historic commercial structures were demolished in the urban renewal efforts of the 1960s. By the late 20th century, most of the city's factories were closed and shipped overseas. Over time, stores throughout the downtown were also closed and boarded up. Pittston, like most cities in the rust belt, witnessed population loss and urban decay.

Contemporary era

On March 15, 1993, two Pittston firefighters (John Lombardo and Len Insalaco) were killed while fighting a blaze on the city's main street. A monument was built in the downtown and the nearby Water Street Bridge was renamed to commemorate their sacrifice during that tragic March day.

For decades, the towering spires of the many Protestant and Roman Catholic churches dominated the city's skyline. Most of the numerous Catholic churches were established to serve one of the many ethnic communities that made up Pittston. The Irish had St. John the Evangelist and St. Mary Help of Christians, the Slovaks had St. John the Baptist, the Lithuanians had St. Casimir's, the Germans had St. Mary Assumption, and the Italians had St. Rocco's and Our Lady of Mount Carmel. There is also a Carpatho-Rusyn Byzantine Catholic Church on Main Street (St. Michael's). From 2004 to the present, the Diocese of Scranton has closed many of the churches and private schools in and around Pittston due to declining population and enrollment. Saint John the Baptist Elementary School closed in 2004, and Seton Catholic High School closed in 2007. St. Mary's Assumption School closed in 2011.

In 2009, Mayor Joseph P. Keating resigned after losing his bid for re-nomination. The city council appointed the first female mayor in the city's history (Donna McFadden-Connors) to serve out the remainder of Keating's term. She was later succeeded in 2010 by the youngest mayor in the city's history (Jason C. Klush).

Pittston City is currently undergoing an economic revitalization since the start of its industrial decline decades ago. In recent years, the downtown area was renovated with new sidewalks, trees, and street lights. Older buildings are being demolished and newer structures (i.e., condominiums, restaurants, bars, and stores) are being built.

Downtown renovation
 

In October 2005, it was revealed that Daniel Siniawa and Associates of Dickson City, Pennsylvania, designed a condo complex for Pittston City. The location of this complex is at Kennedy Boulevard (between the Water Street Bridge and East Street). Riverfront Park is located to the west of the development. After a number of years, the condos were constructed and opened to the public.

In December 2009, several buildings along William Street were demolished.  These included St. John the Baptist Church and School, St. John the Baptist Catholic Information Library, St. John the Baptist Rectory, the Msgr. Joseph A. Super Athletic Center, and Dave's Billiards. The only building remaining is part of the school where DeMuro's Pizzeria is now located. A memorial green space sits where the rest of the school once stood. A monument was also built to commemorate both the school and the church (which served the Slovak community for over one hundred years).

In 2008, under the leadership of Mayor Joseph P. Keating, the city invested in renovating the downtown area sidewalks with a brick theme. Colorful brick pavers line the sidewalks along the curbside and at street crossings. Black street lights and sign posts were also placed to enhance the appearance of the downtown. Trees were also planted throughout the central business district. Since 2008, more downtown restoration has occurred. Older buildings are being demolished and newer structures (i.e., condominiums, restaurants, bars, and stores) are being built. Pittston Parks and Recreation Committee proposed an idea in 2015 to paint many of Pittston's fire hydrants; it began in 2016. They were painted by various artistically inclined locals.

Geography

The City of Pittston lies in the Wyoming Valley on the east side of the Susquehanna River and on the south side of the Lackawanna River. It is approximately midway between Wilkes-Barre and Scranton.

The city can be divided into three sections: the Oregon Section (located in southern Pittston), the Downtown (or City Center), and the Junction (or Upper Pittston). The Oregon Section is a neighborhood located on high ground overlooking the Susquehanna River (in the southern half of the city). The Downtown is located to the north (in the central part of Pittston). U.S. Route 11 passes through this part of the city. Two bridges cross over the Susquehanna and connect the Downtown with the Borough of West Pittston (on the opposite bank). The Downtown is where most of the city's businesses and high-rises exist. The elevation climbs as you move inland (eastward) away from the Susquehanna. The northernmost section of the city is known as the Junction. It is named after the railroad junction (or the Duryea Yard) which runs through its borders. It consists mostly of suburbs built upon several steep hills which overlook both the Susquehanna and Lackawanna Rivers.  The Lackawanna River makes up Pittston's northern border.

The area in and around Pittston is referred to as Greater Pittston and includes Avoca, Dupont, Duryea, Exeter, Exeter Township, Hughestown, Jenkins Township, Laflin, Pittston, Pittston Township, West Pittston, West Wyoming, Wyoming, and Yatesville.

The hardiness zone is 6b.

Demographics

As of the census of 2010, there were 7,739 people, 3,493 households, and 1,992 families residing in the city. The population density was 4,600 people per square mile (1,800/km2). The racial makeup of the city was 95% White, 1.9% Black, 0.2% Native American, 0.5% Asian, 0.0% Pacific Islander, 0.7% from other races, and 1.7% from two or more races. Hispanic or Latino of any race were 2.7% of the population.

According to the 2015 census, the top ten ancestries in the city are: Italian (26.6%), Irish (18.9%), Polish (13.6%), German (13.2%), English (10.9%), Slovak (7.2%), Russian (5.3%), Lithuanian (3.4%), Greek (2.3%), and Arab (1.0%).

There were 3,493 households, out of which 26.9% had children under the age of 18 living with them, 33.3% were married couples living together, 16.9% had a female householder with no husband present, 6.8% had a Male householder with no wife present, and 43% were non-families. 36% of all households were made up of individuals, and 32% had someone living alone who was 65 years of age or older. The average household size was 2.20 and the average family size was 2.89.

In the city, the population was spread out, with 23.1% age 19 or under, 6.4% from 20 to 24, 26% from 25 to 44, 26.6% from 45 to 64, and 14.7% who were 65 years of age or older. The median age was 41 years.

The median income for a household in the city was $35,918 and the median income for a family was $54,000. The per capita income for the city was $24,304. About 17.8% of individuals are below the poverty line, including 22.2% of those under age 18 and 11.9% of those age 65 or over.

Arts and culture

Tomato Festival
The City of Pittston promotes itself as "The Quality Tomato Capital of the World." Images of tomatoes can be seen throughout Pittston. Street signs bear the image of the tomato. The tomato is also painted on many structures and roadways throughout the city. A statue of a large tomato can be seen on the corner of William and Main (in the downtown).

Since 1983, The Pittston Tomato Festival has been held annually on South Main Street in Downtown Pittston to celebrate the city's tradition and heritage in cultivating the tomato. Beginning during the first term of Mayor Thomas Walsh, nearly fifty thousand people attend the four-day event every year. Food (from food vendors throughout the Greater Pittston region), a variety of live entertainment, games, rides, arts and crafts, bingo, and home-grown Pittston tomatoes keep bringing an enthusiastic crowd to the festival year after year. The event also consists of a beauty pageant, a tomato tasting contest, a best looking and ugliest tomato contest, a 5 km run through the city, tomato fights, and a parade. In May 2011, Parade Magazine cited the Pittston Tomato Festival in one of its articles.

Government

Pittston was incorporated as a city in December 1894. As defined by the laws of the Commonwealth of Pennsylvania, Pittston is a Third Class City and operated under the state Third Class City Code.

This was the case until 2013. Following approval by the electorate, Pittston City's government began operating under a Home Rule Charter effective January 2, 2013. Under the home rule charter, the city is governed by a five-member city council composed of four elected city councilmembers and the elected mayor, who, in addition to being the presiding officer of the city council, holds additional executive authority as prescribed by the home rule charter. There is also an elected city controller and elected city tax collector/treasurer who hold specific duties as set forth in the home rule charter. A professional city administrator appointed by the city council oversees the day-to-day operations of the city government.

Pittston's City Hall is located on 35 Broad Street (near the city's downtown). It was constructed in 1939. The building houses the city's three branches of government (legislative, executive, and judicial).

Executive
The city is headed by an elected mayor. The current mayor of Pittston is Michael A. Lombardo.

List of mayors

2017 mayoral election
Former Mayor Mike Lombardo easily won the May 2017 Democratic primary. On Tuesday, November 7, 2017, he defeated his only opponent in the general election (Independent Charles Bufalino). The next mayoral election is scheduled for 2021.

Legislative
A third class city government consists of a mayor and four council members with equal voting power. The four council members are:
 Councilman Danny Argo
 Councilman Kenneth Bangs
 Councilman Michael Lombardo
 Councilman Joseph McLean

The other city officers are:
 City Controller Chris Latona
 City Treasurer Kathy Cunard
 City Administrator Joe Moskovitz

Education

Public
Pittston City is located within the Pittston Area School District, which covers Pittston Township, Dupont, Duryea, Hughestown, Yatesville, Avoca, and Jenkins Township.

The Pittston Area School District consists of four schools:
 Pittston Area Primary Center – Hughestown (Grades: K-1)
 Pittston Area Intermediate Center – Pittston (Grades: 2–4)
 Martin L. Mattei Middle School – Pittston (Grades: 5–8)
 Pittston Area Senior High School – Yatesville (Grades: 9–12)

Private
There were several Catholic schools in the Greater Pittston area; many have been closed by the Diocese of Scranton due to lack of funding and low enrollment.

 Holy Rosary, Duryea

Transportation

Highways
U.S. Route 11 passes through Pittston City. Interstate 81 passes near Pittston, heading north to Binghamton and south to Harrisburg. Pittston is also located near the Northeast Extension of the Pennsylvania Turnpike, Interstate 476, providing a link to Allentown and Philadelphia.

Air
The Wilkes-Barre/Scranton International Airport is located in Pittston Township. The airport is served by eight international airlines and has hosted Air Force One on regional presidential visits several times in the past. In the spring of 2002, the airport began offering an increased number of non-stop flights across the nation.  Service is provided by Allegiant, Delta, United, and American Airlines.

Bus
Pittston is served by the Luzerne County Transportation Authority and COLTS, which provides bus services to the city and other communities within Luzerne County and Lackawanna County. Martz Trailways also provides commuter, tour, and trip service from Pittston, and nearby locations in downtown Scranton and Wilkes-Barre to points east and south, such as Philadelphia, New York City, and Atlantic City.

Rail
At present, the Reading Blue Mountain & Northern Railroad, Norfolk Southern Railway (successor to the Delaware and Hudson) and the Luzerne & Susquehanna Railroad (designated-operator of the county-owned shortline) provide freight service within the city and Pittston Township. A proposed nearby commuter train from Scranton to New York City has received some preliminary government funding.

Public safety

Firefighting
The Pittston City Fire Department provides fire protection for the Greater Pittston region. Today's department operates from its headquarters at 20–22 Kennedy Street in Pittston. The Bureau is staffed by a combination of career and volunteer firefighters. Currently, there are seven full-time firefighters, supplemented by a staff of fifteen part-time firefighters.  The Fire Chief is Frank Roman.

Police
The Pittston City Police Department was established on April 26, 1895. Today's department operates out of City Hall. The city's police provide full-time protection to its citizens, visitors, businesses, and public property. The department also operates a police K-9 unit and specialized detective divisions. The Chief of Police also chairs the city Traffic Committee, which makes recommendations for changes to traffic flow and city parking.  The Chief of Police is Neil Murphy.

Healthcare
Privately run health care clinics are scattered throughout Pittston. In recent years, Geisinger expanded its operations within the city. A new clinic was opened on Main Street (it includes an urgent care). A free health clinic is also located in Pittston. It can be found in the former Seton Catholic High School on William Street.

Notable people

 Banana Joe, radio personality
 Blackbear, singer, songwriter, and record producer
 Charles Calvin Bowman, mayor of Pittston and U.S. Representative from Pennsylvania
 James Joseph Brown, mining innovator
 Bill Bufalino, lawyer
 Russell Bufalino, boss of the Bufalino crime family 
 Lou Butera, former World Champion pool player and member of the Billiard Congress of America Hall of Fame
 Jimmy Cefalo, Penn State football player, Miami Dolphins wide receiver and radio commentator
 William D'Elia, boss of the Bufalino crime family
 J. Harold Flannery, U.S. Representative from Pennsylvania
 Dan Gordon, animator, director, and cartoonist
 George Gordon, animator and director
 Gerry Granahan, singer, songwriter, and record producer
 James L. Hallock, Wisconsin state legislator
 Mike Hudock, football player
 Hughie Jennings, Hall of fame Major League Baseball player and manager
 Shawn Klush, Elvis tribute artist
 John D. MacArthur, insurance salesman and philanthropist
 Tommy McMillan, baseball outfielder and shortstop
 Ray Musto, U.S. Representative from Pennsylvania
 John H. Newton, U.S. Navy Vice Admiral
 Mark O'Keefe, Montana politician
 Jay Parini, professor and author
 Thomas Tigue, Pennsylvania state legislator
 Charley Trippi, football player
 Faustin E. Wirkus, US Marine Corps Sergeant and King of Gonâve Island

References

External links

 
 Pittston Memorial Library
 
 Greater Pittston Chamber of Commerce
 

 
Cities in Pennsylvania
Pennsylvania populated places on the Susquehanna River
Populated places established in 1770
Municipalities of the Anthracite Coal Region of Pennsylvania
Cities in Luzerne County, Pennsylvania
Lackawanna Heritage Valley
1770 establishments in Pennsylvania